Marian Unger (born 17 November 1983) is a German retired footballer.

References

External links

1983 births
Living people
German footballers
FC Carl Zeiss Jena players
VfL Osnabrück players
1. FC Magdeburg players
SV Babelsberg 03 players
FSV Zwickau players
VFC Plauen players
Regionalliga players
3. Liga players
Association football goalkeepers